The 2000 North Hertfordshire District Council election was held on 4 May 2000, at the same time as other local elections across England. 17 of the 49 seats on North Hertfordshire District Council were up for election, being the usual third plus a by-election in Hitchin Walsworth ward.

Ward Results
The results for each ward were as follows. An asterisk(*) indicates a sitting councillor standing for re-election.

The by-election in Hitchin Walsworth ward was to replace Conservative councillor James Ashmore.

Changes 2000–2002

This by-election was to replace Conservative councillor Luke La Plain.

This by-election was to replace Conservative councillor Paul Dee.

This by-election was to replace Labour councillor David Morris.

References

2000 English local elections
2000